Gene Atkins Hill (May 15, 1928 Swartswood, New Jersey – May 31, 1997 Tucson, Arizona) is known for his contribution to nature-related magazines and his subsequent books.

Hill served in Okinawa during World War II. Upon graduation from Harvard, he worked as an advertising copywriter for several Madison Avenue agencies, including J. Walter Thompson.

At first, Hill moonlighted as an outdoors columnist for magazines including Guns & Ammo and Sports Afield. Then, in 1977, he left his day job to become a full-time columnist and associate editor at Field & Stream, where he also wrote the monthly column, "Hill Country". In his outdoor columns, and later in more than a dozen books, Hill wrote about his many outdoor pursuits. Many remember him for his stories of hunting dogs and our relations with them.

Books by Hill include:
 A Hunter's Fireside Book (1972)
 Mostly Tailfeathers (1975)
 Hill Country (1978)
 A Gallery of Waterfowl and Upland Birds (1978)
 The Whispering Wings of Autumn (1981)
 Tears and Laughter (1981)
 Outdoor Yarns & Outright Lies (1983)
 A Listening Walk...and Other Stories (1985)
 Shotgunner's Notebook (1989)
 Sunlight & Shadows (1990)
 Just Mutts (1996)
 Passing a Good Time (1996)

References 

Pete Bodo "Gene Atkins Hill, 69, Columnist For Field & Stream Magazine" New York Times - June 13, 1997, p. D21
Contemporary Authors by Thomson Gale

1928 births
1997 deaths
American columnists
United States Marine Corps personnel of World War II
American copywriters
Harvard University alumni
Child soldiers in World War II